John Long Routt (April 25, 1826 – August 13, 1907) was an American politician of the Republican Party. Born in Eddyville, Kentucky, he served as the first and seventh governor of Colorado from 1876 to 1879 and 1891 to 1893. He also served as mayor of Denver, Colorado from 1883 to 1885. He died in Denver, Colorado.

Early years
John Long Routt was born in Eddyville, Kentucky, and moved to Bloomington, Illinois shortly thereafter where he completed his public school education. Upon completion of his studies, he worked as a carpenter prior to entering elected office.

While living in Illinois, he attained his first elected office as Sheriff of McLean County, Illinois. Routt's blossoming public service career was abruptly interrupted by service in the American Civil War, during which acted as a captain in the 94th Illinois Volunteer Infantry.

Governor of Colorado

Colorado Territory
U.S. President Ulysses S. Grant appointed John Routt as the Governor of the Territory of Colorado on March 29, 1875.  Statehood had long been Colorado's primary interest.  Thomas Patterson and Jerome Chaffee, in House Bill 435, initially provided for the creation of the Colorado state government.  Routt's time as Territorial Governor was largely spent deliberating the contents of the Colorado state constitution.

State of Colorado
After Colorado was established as a state, the increasingly popular Routt easily won the gubernatorial election without making a single speech in public. As the first governor, Routt tackled the major issues Colorado was facing at the time, including violence in and around the city of Creede, Colorado, as well as problems dealing with county valuations.

Routt was also very popular among the female citizenry of the state because of his strong support for women's suffrage - with nudges from his wife, Eliza Pickrell Routt, a pioneer in the women's suffrage movement. At one point, he arranged a speaking tour for popular women's suffragist Susan B. Anthony and personally escorted her around the state. When women in Colorado first became able to vote in 1893, his wife, Eliza Pickrell Routt, became the first woman to register to vote in Colorado history.

Later life
Following his first two terms as Governor of Colorado, Routt entered the private sector, but re-entered public service again to serve as the Mayor of Denver, Colorado from 1883 to 1885. After unsuccessfully running for the United States Senate, Routt ran successfully for the governorship again in 1891, and served as Colorado's seventh Governor until 1893. His third term was marked by a high level of disagreement within the Republicans in Colorado's state government.

Routt was buried in Denver's Riverside Cemetery.
Routt County, Colorado and Routt National Forest are named in his honor.

See also
History of Colorado
Law and government of Colorado
List of governors of Colorado
State of Colorado
Territory of Colorado

References

Bibliography

External links
The Governors of Colorado @ Colorado.gov
Biography of John Long Routt @ Colorado.gov

1826 births
1907 deaths
Colorado Mining Boom
Governors of Colorado Territory
Mayors of Denver
People from Eddyville, Kentucky
Colorado Republicans
Illinois sheriffs
People from Bloomington, Illinois
Republican Party governors of Colorado
Illinois Republicans
American suffragists